Blairgowrie railway station served the burgh of Blairgowrie and Rattray, Perth and Kinross, Scotland from 1855 to 1955 on the Scottish Midland Junction Railway.

History 

It closed to passengers on 10 January 1955 and goods traffic on 6 December 1965. Its former location is now the site of a Tesco supermarket; nearby streets retain railway-themed names.

References

External links 

Disused railway stations in Perth and Kinross
Former Caledonian Railway stations
Railway stations in Great Britain opened in 1855
Railway stations in Great Britain closed in 1955
1855 establishments in Scotland
1965 disestablishments in Scotland
Blairgowrie and Rattray